The Herd of Thunder (often called H.O.T. or the Pride of the Bay) is the name for the athletic bands of the University of South Florida, which includes the show band, "Rumble" pep band, and marching band ensembles, although it is often used to refer simply to the Marching Band. The Herd of Thunder was founded in 1999, two years after USF fielded its first football team.

History

The Herd of Thunder (H.O.T.) Marching Band at The University of South Florida first took the field in September 1999.  With the addition of a football team in 1997, the marching band was a needed faction of USF and was implemented by then University President, Betty Castor. With the help of the Athletic Department, the USF Alumni Association, and the USF School of Music, the Herd of Thunder was born.

The first year 
During the first year, the H.O.T. Marching Band was very eager to start traditions and try new things. Even though there had already been a USF Pep Band for decades (in basketball), an undertaking of this magnitude was very different. Three hundred uniforms were ordered and many new instruments were purchased. At the first day of Marching Band Camp, 140 students were in attendance, under the direction of Dr. Sid Haton. With their instruments, these students were prepared to learn the first drill sets of the USF Pre-game show. A Field Guard of 24 members rounded out the band. New members continued to join the H.O.T. every day, during this important growth period for the band. That first year began the tradition of the "Call" and “Running of the Bulls”, where the band ran from the tunnels of the stadium, "stampeding" onto the football field. By their first game, the H.O.T. had grown to over 200 members. Starting another tradition, their first show featured a Latin theme, including "La Copa de La Vida".  Ironically, the sky thundered during the debut of the Herd of Thunder and the marching band was unable to march. However the rain couldn't stop them, as they still performed from the stands.

Directors of The Herd of Thunder
1999-2002 Dr. Donald Sidney Haton (1963-2008)
2002-2008 Dr. Michael C. Robinson
2008-2009 John Schnettler (Interim)
2009–2018 Dr. Matthew McCutchen2018–2022 Dr. Marc Sosnowchik2022–Present Trevor A. ButtsTraditions
The Herd of Thunder has established many traditions over the years while being a major contributor to the university community and the Tampa Bay area.  The "Call of the Bulls" is a storied one among the trumpet section (formerly known as the "Scream Team") and band members, since most of them never forget running onto the field for the first time with the loud roars of the home crowd cheering them on.  The Road Show and Post-game parade'' have also been staples in H.O.T.'s traditions.

The Bull 
In 1999, HOT band member Keith Sanz was studying at the USF School of Music. He composed a short piece that the Marching Band uses to inspire spirit. This notable tune is "The Bull" chant. The band plays this on offensive 3rd downs or whenever the defense needs to make a stop. "The Bull" became a favorite of USF Bulls fans, who wave their Bulls hands in the air whenever this song is played.

South Florida school songs

The Herd of Thunder performs several school spirit songs, including the Golden Brahman March (USF fight song), Alma Mater, "The Bull", and March Victorious.

Pregame

The University of South Florida pregame festivities begin with the Herd of Thunder luring tailgaters to the stadium with their parking lot concert ("Road Show"), where they play the Golden Brahman March, March Victorious, The Bull, and other tunes to pump up the last of the tailgaters. 15 minutes before game-time, the HOT band perform the "Call of the Bulls Fanfare", which begins the USF on-field pregame tradition.

The drumline begins the cadence to signal the entire band, cheerleaders, and Rocky the Bull to come "stampeding" onto the field. This format, gives the illusion of a small and modest performance before filling the field with USF pride and "blowing away" the audience each time. Right after the "Call of the Bulls Fanfare", The Herd of Thunder then performs their version of "El Toro Caliente", March Victorious, the Golden Brahman March (USF Fight Song), and the USF Alma Mater, before leading the stadium in the National Anthem. HOT then forms the "iconic U", and precedes to play "The Bull" which they play to each side of the stadium to begin the football team's stampede.  After forming a tunnel in front of the entrance to the field, HOT again performs "The Bull", until the team comes running out, they then cut directly into the Fight Song.

Stands
HOT plays downs cheers on each offensive down to energize the crowd, in addition to stands tunes during timeouts and other opportune times. A notable tune which has been used as both a stands tune and a down cheer is Rage Against the Machine's Bulls on Parade. A popular stand tune played on 3rd downs is “#9” or the “Barbarian Horde” mainly to get the crowd screaming to distract the opposing team

Halftime
The Herd of Thunder performs several different halftime shows each year, and performs during each home game at Raymond James Stadium, select away games, bowl games, and other exhibitions.  After halftime at Raymond James, the band has a chance to get the crowd pumped up for the 2nd half, when returning to their section.

Postgame
The Herd of Thunder concludes each game with a playing of the USF Alma Mater and the Marching Band's own personal alma mater, "The Mission". This portion of the game is always conducted by the Director of Athletic Bands. When leaving the stadium, the HOT Drum Line parades out of Raymond James, with fans following, and ending with a final parking lot concert.

2013 London New Year's Day Parade

On February 27, 2012, former Lord Mayor of Westminster Duncan Sandys visited the University of South Florida to formally present an invitation to the Herd of Thunder to participate in the 2013 London New Year's Day Parade. The band performed in a parade whose route extended through Piccadilly Circus, Regent Street, Trafalgar Square, and Whitehall; the street attendance was in excess of a half million people, and the worldwide television viewership was over 220 million.

Gallery

References

External links
 

American Athletic Conference marching bands
University of South Florida
Musical groups established in 1999
1999 establishments in Florida